Critical Reviews in Microbiology is an international, peer-reviewed academic journal that publishes comprehensive review articles covering all areas of medical microbiology. Areas covered by the journal include bacteriology, virology, microbial genetics, epidemiology, and diagnostic microbiology. It is published by Taylor and Francis Group.

Core research areas 

Expert reviewers address the following disciplines:

 Molecular biology 
 Microbial genetics 
 Microbial physiology 
 Microbial biochemistry 
 Microbial structure 
 Medical microbiology 
 Epidemiology 
 Public health 
 Diagnostic microbiology

Editor-in-chief

Publication format 

Critical Reviews in Microbiology publishes 4 issues per year in simultaneous print and online editions.

Subscribers to the electronic edition of Critical Reviews in Microbiology receive access to the online archive, which dates back to 1971, as part of their subscription.

External links
 Taylor and Francis Group is the leading international provider of specialist information and services for the academic and scientific, professional and commercial business communities.

References

Publications established in 1971
Microbiology journals
Taylor & Francis academic journals
English-language journals